The following is a list of best-selling albums by country. Depends on the measurement, record sales of albums are taken by estimations or certifications.

Argentina

Australia

Austria

Belgium

Bolivia

Brazil

Burkina Faso

Canada

Chile

China

Colombia

Croatia

Czech Republic

Denmark

Dominican Republic

Ecuador

Estonia

Finland

France

Germany

Ghana 

 Additional information: According to a 2003 report from The Society, gospel music in Ghana constituted the largest commercial genre by that time; and 5,000 copies sold of a record were technically a "hit" in the country. A 2005 article of Daily Graphic, puts the highest amount that a musician can peak to be 50,000 copies.

Greece

Haiti 

Additional information: Legitimate album sales higher estimates are considered to be between 5,000 to even a "maximum" of 10,000 of a record.

Hong Kong

Hungary

Iceland

India and Pakistan 

The following list includes both Indian and Pakistani albums, due to their music industries being closely linked. The data mentioned may not be totally accurate due to lack of trusted resources.

Indonesia

Ireland

Israel

Italy

Ivory Coast

Jamaica

Japan 

Sales figure derived from data that the Oricon provided in 2007.

Malaysia 

Sales figure derived from various sources.

Malta

Malawi

Mexico

Nine of the ten best-selling albums of all time in Mexico are from national artists.

Netherlands

New Zealand

Nigeria

Norway

Peru

Philippines

The Philippine Association of the Record Industry or PARI is the organization responsible for awarding record certifications in the Philippines since 1999. Here are the top 10 of the 40 best-selling albums in the country.

Poland

Portugal

Romania

Russia

South Africa

South Korea

Serbia 
The following statistic doesn't show actual sales figures, but the circulation of the albums released since June 2006

Singapore

Slovak Socialist Republic

Spain

Sweden

Switzerland

Taiwan

Tanzania 

 Additional information: Between 1999 and 2001 "several rappers" sold over 100,000 copies of their albums. Dudubaya sold 25,000 copies with Papo na Papo (2004) in its first-week.

Thailand

Turkey

Ukraine

United Kingdom

United States

Latin

Uruguay

USSR

Venezuela

Yugoslavia

Zimbabwe

By region

Central America

Europe

Middle East (Gulf States)

See also

 List of best-selling albums
 List of best-selling albums of the 2000s (century)

Notes

References